E. Isaac Moskovitz is a consulting academic in the fields of luxury marketing and the diamond industry. He has published on the topic of luxury and human logic and is the developer of the Lambda and Theta Worldview identification metrics and the philosophy behind it that he calls Janus Thinking or Human Logic. 

He is currently president of Janus Thinking Ltd and Allied Diamonds Inc. Moskovitz recently helped creating Kahro Diamonds Inc. in Raleigh NC, which approach follows Moskovitz's ideas on luxury. He is also the author of Janus Thinking, a blog on luxury and luxury marketing.

Personal history
E. Isaac Mostovicz was born in Tel Aviv. In 1981 he re-located to Antwerp, Belgium and became a partner and CEO at S. Muller & Sons, a leading Antwerp-based diamond manufacturer and distributor. Mostovicz was among the pioneers who found the way to polish the now popular Hearts-and-Arrow cut as early as 1985 turning his factory into one of the very best in the industry. Training his polishers to express their personality through diamond polishing in a true artisan way earned Mostovicz the confidence of Mr. Taruhito Tamura of Good Company who entrusted Mostovicz as the only person outside Tamura's organization to manufacture and to distribute Tamura's EightStar diamond and its derivatives, the Theta and Lambda diamonds. The polishing skills of S. Muller & Sons and the marketing knowledge of Mostovicz were the main reasons for selecting S. Muller & Sons as the only 10 customers of the DTC (De Beers) to distribute the De Beers Millennium diamond limited edition. Working under the supervision of Prof. Leslie de Chernatony, a brand expert, allowed S. Muller & Sons to turn this opportunity into a success where others failed.

The interest of Mostovicz in the interaction between the diamond consumer and the retailer is unusual in the diamond industry, where the focus is generally on rough diamond market. The understanding of the critical stage of the retail marketing led Mostovicz to conclude as early as 1994 that the diamond industry was crumbling. Upon viewing the grim future and since he could not find sufficient answers within the diamond industry Mostovicz turned to higher education, completing his MBA and PhD.  He is currently a visiting fellow of the Northampton Business School (NBS) of the University of Northampton . Mostovicz claims to be the one who warned the industry that it faces destruction as early as the late 1990s. Mostovicz is now marketing his diamonds in the US in a way based on his research and inspired by Mr. Tamura's approach.

Mostovicz received his MBA in 2000 from The Open University in the United Kingdom, and his PhD from University of Northampton in 2008. He received his PhD from University of Northampton in 2008, with a thesis "The Structure of Interpretation and its Role in Knowledge Creation". During his research he uncovered the Lambda and Theta worldview types as it pertains to luxury and luxury marketing. Mostovicz lives in Israel with his wife and children.

About Lambda and Theta
During his PhD research, Mostovicz defined two opposite psychological types – Lambda and Theta. Mostovicz describes the two worldview types on his blog, Janus Thinking:

"The typical Theta (Θ) personality seeks affiliation and control as an ultimate life purpose.  Because of this, they loom to fit in or contextualise themselves within a desired group and use socially-derived understandings of product characteristics as a basis for their consumption. Lambdas (Λ), on the other hand, seek achievement and uniqueness as an ultimate end goal.  As a result, they are more likely to interpret products based on their individual responses to the product, how it helps/prevents them to stand out, and how the product benchmarks against their regular consumptive patterns".

Affiliations
Mostovicz is an associate editor for the International Journal of E-Politics. He is the founding member of the International Board of Governors at Jerusalem College of Technology in Jerusalem, Israel and fellow with the Chartered Institute of Marketing. Mostovicz is also a member of the Academy of Management, the American Marketing Association, the Antwerpen Diamond Bourse (Beurs voor Diamanthandel) and the American Gem Society.

A selection of Academic Contributions
 "A dynamic theory of leadership development" in Leadership & Organization Development Journal
 "Is an ethical society possible?” in Society and Business Review
 "Means-end laddering: a motivational perspective" in Problems and Perspectives in Management
 "CSR: The role of leadership in driving ethical outcomes" in International Journal of Business in Society
 "Janusian Mapping: A Mechanism of Interpretation" in Systemic Practice and Action Research
 'Debunking the Relationship Marketing Myth: Towards a Purposeful Relationship-Building Model?’, the 5th International Conference for Consumer Behaviour and Retailing Research (CIRCLE), University of Nicosia, Cyprus, March, 26th–29th.
 'Ideal Leader or Purposeful Strategist?: The Theory and Practice of Organisational Leadership', 15th International Symposium on Ethics, Business and Society, Business and management: Towards more human models and practices, IESE Business School, University of Navarra, Barcelona, Spain, 16–17 May.
 'Is Leading through Strategic Change Necessary?’, 5th European Conference on Management Leadership and Governance (ECMLG), Mini track on Management, Leadership and Governance in Relation to Information Systems, Hellenic American University, Athens, Greece, 5 – 6 November 2009.

References

External links
 Janus Thinking
 Allied Diamonds
 Andrew Kakabadse and Nada Kakabadse

Living people
Belgian people of Israeli descent
Israeli Jews
Belgian academics
Belgian Jews
Belgian emigrants to Israel
Year of birth missing (living people)